Kōkichi, Kokichi or Koukichi (written: 幸吉, 小吉, 浩吉 or 鋼吉) is a masculine Japanese given name. Notable people with the name include:

, Japanese baseball player
, Japanese samurai
, Japanese footballer and manager
, Japanese photographer
, Japanese businessman and inventor
, Japanese soldier and businessman
, Japanese long-distance runner
, Japanese aviation pioneer
, Ultimate Supreme leader

See also
, a character in the video game Danganronpa V3: Killing Harmony

Japanese masculine given names